USA Basketball (USAB) is a non-profit organization and the governing body for basketball in the United States.  The organization represents the United States in FIBA and the men's and women's national basketball teams in the United States Olympic & Paralympic Committee. Its chairman of the board is retired General Martin Dempsey and its CEO is Jim Tooley.

The organization was founded in 1974 as the Amateur Basketball Association of the United States of America (ABAUSA). It was renamed USA Basketball on October 12, 1989, after FIBA modified its rules to allow NBA basketball players to compete in international competitions (professionals from Europe and South America were always allowed to compete). USA Basketball is responsible for the selection and training of the men's and women's national teams that represent the United States in international tournaments, including the FIBA Basketball World Cup for men, the FIBA Women's Basketball World Cup, Games of the Olympiad and the men's and women's qualifiers thereof, as well as for the promotion of the sport amongst prospective players, spectators, and fans.

U.S. men's teams' schedule

(1) In 2007, the U.S. was represented by the University of Northern Iowa.
(2) The U.S. was represented at the 2015 World University Games by the University of Kansas.
(3) The U.S. was represented at the 2017 World University Games by Purdue University.

U.S. women's teams' schedule

(1) In 2003, the U.S. was represented by a Big 12 All Star team.

(2) In 2007, the U.S. was represented by the University of North Carolina at Charlotte.

(3) In 2017, the U.S. was represented by the University of Maryland.

(4) In 2019, the U.S. was represented by Mississippi State University.

Sources

See also

U.S. men
 United States men's national basketball team
 United States men's national under-19 basketball team
 United States men's national under-17 basketball team
 United States men's national 3x3 team

U.S. women
 United States women's national basketball team
 United States women's national under-19 basketball team
 United States women's national under-17 basketball team
 USA Women’s World University Games Team
 USA Women’s R. William Jones Cup Team
 USA Women's Pan American Team
 United States women's national 3x3 team

Logo

References

External links
 
 USA Basketball reports from Insidehoops.com

United States
Basketball in the United States
Basketball
Organizations based in Colorado Springs, Colorado
Sports in Colorado Springs, Colorado
Basketball governing bodies in North America
Sports organizations established in 1974
1974 establishments in the United States